José de Jesús Esteves (October 15, 1881 in Aguadilla, Puerto Rico - November 1, 1918 in New York, New York) was a Puerto Rican poet, lawyer, and judge in the Manatí Municipal Court. He was an expositor of the Modernismo literary movement.

He wrote three verse books, Besos y Plumas (Kisses and Pens), Crisálidas, and Rosal de Amor (Rose of Love).  His most famous works are "Sinfonía Helénica" (Greek Symphony), "Ronda de Anforas" (Round of Anforas), "El Ladrón" (The Thief), "Sauce Lírico" (Lyric Willow), and "Alma Adentro" (Soul Inside). "Alma Adentro" won a contest in Revista Mundial of Paris.

He died in New York on November 1, 1918.

His tomb is in the Old Urban Cemetery of Aguadilla, Puerto Rico.

References

1880s births
1918 deaths
20th-century Puerto Rican lawyers
Puerto Rican poets
Puerto Rican male writers
People from Aguadilla, Puerto Rico
20th-century American poets
20th-century American male writers